The women's discus throw at the 2012 IPC Athletics European Championships was held at Stadskanaal Stadium from 24–28 July.

Medalists
Results given by IPC Athletics.

Results

F11/12

F35/36

F37

F57/58

See also
List of IPC world records in athletics

References

discus throw
2012 in women's athletics
Discus throw at the World Para Athletics European Championships